The Cherokee Scout is a weekly newspaper in Murphy, North Carolina, and Cherokee County. It is one of the largest newspapers in far-west North Carolina. The newspaper won numerous awards from the North Carolina Press Association including news photography in 2016 as well as sports and religion reporting in 2016. The paper won second place in the "Best Niche Publication" category that year as well. In 2019, photographer Ben Katz won Hugh Morton Photographer of the Year in the Community Newspaper Division.

The print edition is published on Wednesdays and had a paid circulation of 8,000 in 2018. It is published by Community Newspapers, Inc. (CNI), Athens, Georgia. It merged with The Andrews Journal on January 1, 2019.

See also
 List of newspapers published in North Carolina

References

External links
 Cherokee Scout: The local news and information source for Cherokee County, North Carolina
 Online historic issues of The Cherokee Scout at DigitalNC

Weekly newspapers published in North Carolina
Cherokee County, North Carolina